The Brampton Arts Walk of Fame is an honours system located at the Rose Theatre Brampton, in Ontario, Canada. It previously was known as the Brampton Walk of Fame, or Art Walk of Fame. The first currently recognized inductions took place in 2014, and include past and present residents of Brampton.

A previous incarnation, launched in summer 2011 in promotion of the International Indian Film Academy (IIFA) Awards, included an actress who was making her first visit to Brampton. None of these inductions have been followed through on, beyond their initial events.

Inductees 
Since 2014, the inductees are:

A councillor has publicly asked for Sidhu Moose Wala's inclusion.

History

Initial Walk plans 

The walk was mentioned in an October 2008 planning document for the Brampton Arts Council, which suggested their executive director would be involved in establishing a criterion for inclusion, in co-operation with the Arts, Culture and Theatre Department of the City of Brampton (which manages the Rose Theatre). It suggested that city council approval would be needed. No city committee minutes or city council minutes posted on the City of Brampton website made any mention of the walk. A Brampton Guardian article listed the "honours Brampton citizens—both past and present—that have made significant contributions to the world of arts and entertainment." The article claims the walk was established in 2010.

The weekend before the IIFA Awards were presented in Toronto, Ontario, the City of Brampton hosted an event called "IIFA Buzz Brampton". Festivities included music, dance performances, a marketplace, and the retheming of the annual Flower City Parade. One event, announced shortly before the event and held June 17, was the creation of a walk of fame. Inductees would be Indian film star Bipasha Basu, and locally-residing musicians RDB and Nindy Kaur.

Publicity for the first induction claimed that it would be a private ceremony for VIPs only, the unveiling was public. Despite inducting two individuals and one group, the walk of fame is not yet "official" with the city, according to media reports. The ceremony was hosted by movie critic Mohit Rajhans of the neighbouring city of Mississauga, and actor, model, and activist Lisa Ray. While the unveiling ceremony was in the public square, most of the event was private.

In late 2011, the city was scheduled to induct Russell Peters as to become the first formal inductee to the Walk of Fame; nothing more was mentioned of that induction. (He has since been inducted into the actual Walk.)

Previous inductees 

The following inductees were named during the Walk's first incarnation. They have never actually been placed on the Walk of Fame, or de-inducted.

Interim discussion 

The HACE Downtown Brampton Creative Economy Round Table, a committee of the City of Brampton, received correspondence in October 2012 from a Brampton resident which included mention of the Walk. In this December meeting, staff advised the committee that the corporation was working on developing a Walk, which would be discussed at a future Flower City Committee meeting. The Flower City Committee deemed that the walk "has existed for a long time", and would look into the status.

In 2013, Brampton Day (traditionally in September) was merged into the events held on the day of the Flower City Parade. Events included a "Walk of Fame", promising that you could "get your photo taken with your favourite star!" Larger-than-life cardboard cutouts of celebrities were posted along a red carpet. Celebrities were Lady Gaga, Britney Spears, Usher, Beyoncé, Justin Bieber, Christina Aguilera, Justin Timberlake, Katy Perry, and Adam Levine.

2014 reboot 

A staff report was presented to the Committee of Council on September 18, dubbing the project the "Brampton Arts Walk of Fame"; the Committee of Council recommended acceptance, eligibility criteria, and the first inductees. The first event may be connected to an existing downtown event, "for financial and other reasons"; Councillor John Hutton suggested it would be unlikely to get the inductees to attend on a preset date. The Brampton Arts Council is on the Brampton Arts Walk of Fame Committee.

The established categories are performing arts, visual arts, media arts, literature, and creative arts. Inductees must have ten years in the arts and entertainment industry, and have been born in Brampton, a resident of Brampton, or an owner of a business in Brampton for a period of time.

The walk would be located in Garden Square at the Rose Theatre. Beginning in 2014, red granite plaques will be unveiled annually, featuring a star icon, award category, recipient's name, and the year of the award.

The event may be branded in the future; the City of Brampton is selling sponsorship rights.

Other civic honours
Other civic honours existed in Brampton before this "walk". The Brampton Sports Hall of Fame was created in 1979; when the Brampton Centre for Sports and Entertainment opened in 1999, it moved into the facility. In 2002 the City of Brampton Economic Development Office investigated the creation of a Brampton Business Walk of Fame. The council referred the concept to the Ambassador Committee "for consideration of a Virtual Walk of Fame." In 2005, the Brampton Indie Arts Festival included an induction ceremony for Canadian comedian Scott Thompson. Thompson is a member of comedy troupe The Kids in the Hall, which won the Rose d'Or and is on Canada's Walk of Fame. In 2011, the council was informed that the Flower City Strategy Committee was considering a Tree Hall of Fame.

Notes

References

External links
 

Walks of fame
Culture of Brampton
Halls of fame in Canada